Paddy Andrews (born 18 July 1988) is a Gaelic footballer who plays for St Brigid's and previously with the Dublin county team. He has been on the Dublin football panel since January 2008. He is the younger brother of former Dublin footballer Peadar Andrews. He won a Sigerson Cup medal with DCU in 2010.

On 17 August 2011, Andrews signed for Monaghan United in the League of Ireland First Division.

Andrews won the Dublin Senior Football Championship with St Brigid's in 2011.

Andrews won the all-Ireland senior football championship with Dublin in September 2013 at Croke Park against Mayo.

Following the completion of the five-in-row in 2019, Andrews spent a week in New York with Ciarán Kilkenny and Dean Rock.

In January 2021, Andrews announced his retirement from inter-county football after 12 years.

Career statistics

Honours
 Leinster Senior Football Championship (9): 2008, 2009, 2012, 2013, 2014, 2015, 2016, 2017, 2018
 All-Ireland Senior Football Championship (7): 2013, 2015, 2016, 2017, 2018, 2019, 2020
 National Football League (5): 2013, 2014, 2015, 2016, 2018

References

1988 births
Living people
Alumni of Dublin City University
Association footballers from County Dublin
Association footballers not categorized by position
DCU Gaelic footballers
Dublin inter-county Gaelic footballers
Gaelic footballers who switched code
Gaelic football forwards
Monaghan United F.C. players
Republic of Ireland association footballers
St Brigid's (Dublin) Gaelic footballers
Winners of six All-Ireland medals (Gaelic football)